Ștefan Burghiu (born 28 March 1991) is a Moldovan footballer who plays as a defender for Zimbru Chișinău in the Moldovan National Division.

International career
Burghiu played seven matches for the Moldova national team between 2014 and 2015. He made his international debut in a friendly match against Sweden on 17 January 2014.

Honours
Zimbru Chișinău
Moldovan Cup: 2013–14
Moldovan Super Cup: 2014

Zhetysu
Kazakhstan First Division: 2017

References

External links
 

Living people
1991 births
Association football defenders
Moldovan footballers
Moldova international footballers
Moldovan expatriate footballers
Moldovan expatriate sportspeople in Romania
Expatriate footballers in Romania
Moldovan expatriate sportspeople in Kazakhstan
Expatriate footballers in Kazakhstan
FC Nistru Otaci players
FC Zimbru Chișinău players
CS Petrocub Hîncești players
FC Zhetysu players
FC Sfîntul Gheorghe players
CSM Focșani players
Speranța Nisporeni players
Moldovan Super Liga players
Kazakhstan First Division players
Liga III players
Place of birth missing (living people)
Real Succes Chișinău players